Origin Vol. 1 (also referred to as Origin I) is an album by the Swedish band The Soundtrack of Our Lives.  It was released in Europe in October 2004, and in the US in March 2005. Actor and singer Jane Birkin appears on the track "Midnight Children".

The song "Bigtime" was used as the official theme song for WrestleMania 21 and was later used in Gran Turismo 4 as part of the soundtrack. "Bigtime" was also used by Sky One in an advert for a new episode of Futurama. The song "Mother One Track Mind" was also used in Gran Turismo 4 as part of the soundtrack.

Singles from the album are "Bigtime", "Heading For a Breakdown" and "Believe I've Found".

Track listing

U.S. version bonus tracks
 "To Somewhere Else" (also available on the "Heading for a Breakdown" single)
 "World Bank" (also available on the "Bigtime" single)

Personnel
Mattias Bärjed – guitar, backing vocals
Åke Karl Kalle Gustafsson – bass, backing vocals
Martin Hederos – piano, organ, backing vocals
Ebbot Lundberg – lead vocals, autoharp
Ian Person – guitar, backing vocals
Fredrik Sandsten – drums, percussion

Additional personnel
Jane Birkin – vocals on "Midnight Children"
Natacha Le Jeune – backing vocals on "Midnight Children"
Simon Ohlsson – backing vocals on "Midnight Children"
Stefan Sporsén – trumpet on "Lone Summer Dream"

Charts

Weekly charts

Year-end charts

References

2004 albums
The Soundtrack of Our Lives albums